The swimming competition at the 1965 Summer Universiade took place in Budapest, Hungary.

Men’s events

Women’s events

Medal table

References
Medalist Summary (Men) on GBRATHLETICS.com
Medalist Summary (Women) on GBRATHLETICS.com

Swimming at the Summer Universiade
Uni
1965 Summer Universiade